Sagdiyev is a Turkic languages surname. Its feminine form is Sagdiyeva. It is a slavicised version of Sagdi, Sagdat or Sagdatdin by introduction of the suffix -yev.

Real people with the surname  
  (born 1946) 
  (born 1950) 
  (1928—2012) 
 Samariddin Sagdiyev (1918—1983), a Tajik actor
  (born 1954)

Fictional characters 
 Borat Sagdiyev

Turkic-language surnames